Knee buckle may refer to:

 A fashion accessory used to fasten knee breeches at or just below the knee
 A shoe buckle used to fasten the knee-high boots just below the level of the knee.
 Knee buckling, a medical condition